Jean Robin (25 July 1921 – 8 October 2004) was a French footballer and football manager.

Player career
He spent his entire career in hometown Marseille.

Manager career
He coached Olympique de Marseille three times.

References

1921 births
2004 deaths
French footballers
Olympique de Marseille players
Ligue 1 players
French football managers
Olympique de Marseille managers
Association football forwards
Footballers from Marseille